Eceköy (also: Ece) is a village in the Bozüyük District, Bilecik Province, Turkey. Its population is 32 (2021).

References

Villages in Bozüyük District